The Yamaha XTZ 660 Ténéré is a dual-sport motorcycle produced by Yamaha from 1991 to 1999. The bike is named after the Ténéré desert stage of the former Paris-Dakar Rally in northeastern Niger. The 1991 to 1993 version has a rectangular front light, while the 1994 and later models had two circular lights. Yamaha's team performance during the 1990s editions of the Dakar resulted in a good reputation for the XTZ family.

Notes

 

XTZ 660
Dual-sport motorcycles
Motorcycles introduced in 1991